Lee Han-wi (born June 17, 1961) is a South Korean actor. Since his acting debut in 1983, Lee has become a prolific supporting actor on Korean film and television. He is particularly known for his mastery of ad-libbing.

Filmography

Film

Television series

Web series

Variety show

Theater

Awards and nominations

References

External links
 
 
 

1961 births
Living people
South Korean male television actors
South Korean male film actors
South Korean male stage actors
Chung-Ang University alumni
People from Gwangju
20th-century South Korean male actors
21st-century South Korean male actors